An op-ed, is a written prose piece, typically published by an English-language North-American newspaper or magazine, which usually expresses the opinion of an author or entity not affiliated with the publication's editorial board. In 2021, The New York Times—the paper credited with developing and naming the modern op-ed page—announced that it was retiring the label, and would instead call submitted opinion pieces "Guest Essays."

Origin 

A theorized origin of the modern op-ed page is the "Page Op.," created in 1921 by Herbert Bayard Swope of The New York Evening World. When Swope took over as main editor in 1920, he opted to designate a page opposite letters from editorial staff as "a catchall for book reviews, society boilerplate, and obituaries". He wrote:

With the development of and subsequent availability of new forms of information access and distribution through radio and television broadcasting, stakeholders and print journalism workers sought to increase or maintain their audience and relevance. According to the Grolier Multimedia Encyclopedia, major newspapers such as The New York Times and The Washington Post began including more opinionated journalism, adding more columns and increasing the extent of their opinion pages to drive public participation and readership.

The "modern" op-ed page was developed in 1970 under the direction of The New York Times editor John B. Oakes. The first op-ed page of The New York Times appeared on 21 September 1970. 
Media scholar Michael J. Socolow writes of Oakes' innovation: The Times' effort synthesized various antecedents and editorial visions. Journalistic innovation is usually complex, and typically involves multiple external factors. The Times' op-ed page appeared in an era of democratizing cultural and political discourse and of economic distress for the company itself. The newspaper's executives developed a place for outside contributors with space reserved for sale at a premium rate for additional commentaries and other purposes.

Influence 
The influence of op-ed pages in shaping public opinion and policy has been widely noted.

Possible conflicts of interest 

The various connections between op-eds, editors, and funding from interest groups have raised concern.  In 2011, in an open letter to The New York Times, a group of U.S. journalists and academics called for conflict of interest transparency in op-eds.

See also 

 Opinion piece
 Feuilleton
 Pundit

References

External links 

 
 A robot wrote this entire article. Are you scared yet, human? - the first op-ed completely written by an artificial intelligence (AI), published in September 2020 by The Guardian
How to Write an Op-ed or Column
Classic Op-Ed Structure
The Op-Ed Project
How to Write an Op-Ed video

Opinion journalism
Newspaper content
Essays